St Andrew's Church, Hempstead is the Church of England parish church of Hempstead, near Stalham, Norfolk, England.

The church is a Grade II* listed building.

History
The oldest part of the church is the chancel, which was built in the 13th century. The nave was built in the 14th century. The nave used to have aisles, but these were demolished in the 15th century. In the 15th century the west tower was built and a wooden tracery screen was inserted in the chancel arch.

The upper part of the chancel screen has Perpendicular Gothic tracery of an unusual type. The lower part has two rows of eight panels which had 15th-century paintings of saints, most of which survive. In February 1982 a thief using a screwdriver removed from the screen a panel bearing a painting of Saint Eligius. The panel has never been recovered.

The pulpit and reading desk are 17th-century.

The west tower has three bells. The second bell was cast by an unknown founder at the end of the 14th century. Brasyers of Norwich cast the tenor bell at the end of the 15th century. Thomas Newman of Norwich cast the treble bell in 1707.

References

Further reading

External links

13th-century church buildings in England
Church of England church buildings in Norfolk
Grade II* listed churches in Norfolk